Natural City is a 2003 South Korean science fiction film, set in a dystopian future, about a colony world that integrates robots, androids and cyborgs amongst the population.

Plot 
Two police officers, R and Noma, hunt down renegade cyborgs. The cyborgs serve a number of duties, ranging from military commandos to "dolls", engineered for companionship. They have a limited 3-year lifespan, although black market technology has been developed to transfer a cyborg's artificial intelligence into the brain of a human host.

This breakthrough compels R into finding Cyon, an orphaned prostitute, who may serve as the host for the mind of his doll Ria. He has fallen deeply in love with his doll and she has only a few days left to live.

Eventually, R must make a decision between leaving the colony with Ria to spend her last days with him on a paradise-like planet or save his friends when a renegade combat cyborg takes over the police headquarters.

Cast
 Yoo Ji-tae as R
 Lee Jae-eun as Cyon
 Seo Lin as Ria
 Jung Eun-pyo as Croy
 Yoon Chan as Noma
 Jung Doo-hong as Cypher
 Ko Ju-hye as Ami

Reception
The film received mixed to positive reviews. Rotten Tomatoes gave at the film 67% positive reviews.

References

External links
 
 
 Natural City at HanCinema
 

2003 science fiction action films
2003 films
Dystopian films
2000s dystopian films
2000s Korean-language films
Mad scientist films
South Korean post-apocalyptic films
Robot films
South Korean science fiction action films
Films set in the future
Films about artificial intelligence
Cyborg films
Android (robot) films
Films set in 2080
Cyberpunk films
2000s South Korean films